= Quwayrat al-Khazab =

Coordinates: 15°11′N 48°20′E

- Interactive map of Quwayrat al-Khazab
- Country: Yemen
- Governorate: Hadhramaut
- Time zone: UTC+3 (Yemen Standard Time)

Quwayrat al-Khazab is a village in eastern Yemen. It is located in the Hadhramaut Governorate.
